Skwentna is a census-designated place (CDP) on Iditarod Trail in Matanuska-Susitna Borough, Alaska, United States. Located 61 miles northwest of Wasilla along the Skwentna River, it is part of the Anchorage, Alaska Metropolitan Statistical Area. At the 2020 census the population was 62, up from 37 in 2010.

Geography and climate
Skwentna is located at  (61.879482, −151.266455).

As with much of South Central Alaska, Skwentna has a dry-summer subarctic climate (Köppen climate classification: Dsc), with long, cold, snowy winters and short, warm summers, although, as is more typical of the Alaska Interior, August averages cooler than June; the town is also located in USDA Plant Hardiness Zone 3, indicating the coldest temperature of the year is typically in the −40 to −30 °F (−40 to −34 °C). August through October is the wettest period of the year, while snow typically falls from October to April (rarely May or September), accumulating .

Demographics

Skwentna first appeared on the 1950 U.S. Census as an unincorporated village. It did not appear again until 1990, when it was made a census-designated place (CDP).

As of the census of 2000, there were 111 people, 50 households, and 29 families residing in the CDP. The population density was 0.3 people per square mile (0.1/km2). There were 360 housing units at an average density of 0.8/sq mi (0.3/km2). The racial makeup of the CDP was 92.79% White, 6.31% Native American, and 0.90% from two or more races.

There were 50 households, out of which 22% had children under the age of 18 living with them, 48% were married couples living together, 6% had a female householder with no husband present, and 42% were non-families. 36% of all households were made up of individuals, and none had someone living alone who was 65 years of age or older. The average household size was 2.22 and the average family size was 2.90.

In the CDP, the population was spread out, with 22.5% under the age of 18, 5.4% from 18 to 24, 23.4% from 25 to 44, 44.1% from 45 to 64, and 4.5% who were 65 years of age or older. The median age was 45 years. For every 100 females, there were 164.3 males. For every 100 females age 18 and over, there were 168.8 males.

The median income for a household in the CDP was $16,250, and the median income for a family was $52,917. Males had a median income of $13,333 versus $18,750 for females. The per capita income for the CDP was $23,994. There were no families and 5.8% of the population living below the poverty line, including no under eighteens and none of those over 64.

References

Census-designated places in Alaska
Census-designated places in Matanuska-Susitna Borough, Alaska
Anchorage metropolitan area